The 2011 Fort Lauderdale Strikers season was the first season of the new team in the new North American Soccer League. Previously, the Miami FC had fielded a team that played for four seasons in the USL First Division and another for one season in the USSF Division 2 Professional League.  After joining the new NASL, the club connected with the original Fort Lauderdale Striker's club. After 14 years, since 1997, the name and legacy was brought back and now placed together with Miami FC, uniting the clubs under the Striker's name.  This marked the entire club's thirty-seventh season in professional soccer.  In the inaugural year of the league, the club fielded the new team and finished fourth in the regular season.  They made the playoffs and continued into the NASL Championship Series.  They were this year's Runners-up.

Club

Coaching staff

Squad

Current roster
as of October 29, 2011

Transfers

In

Out

Competitions
Updated as published November 13, 2011.

Regular season

Standings
Overall

Playoffs

Recognition

NASL Player of the Week

References

External links
 Strikers Official site
 Miami FC Supporters Group

2011
Fort Lauderdale Strikers
Fort Lau
2011 in sports in Florida